Aaron Brown may refer to:

Sportspeople
 Aaron Brown (defensive lineman) (1943–1997), American football player
 Aaron Brown (running back) (born 1985), American football player
 Aaron Brown (linebacker) (born 1956), American NFL and CFL linebacker
 Aaron Brown (footballer, born 1980), English footballer who plays as a midfielder for Darlington
 Aaron Brown (footballer, born 1983), English footballer who played for Preston North End
 Aaron Brown (sprinter) (born 1992), Canadian sprinter
 Aaron Brown (rugby league) (born 1992), British rugby league player
 Aaron Brown (1883–1934), Hall of Fame Boxer, better known as Dixie Kid

Other people
 Aaron Brown (journalist) (born 1948), American broadcast journalist
 Aaron Brown (financial author) (born 1956), American financial author and professor
 Aaron Brown (musician) (born 1980), Australian-American violinist and composer
 Aaron V. Brown (1795–1859), American politician
 Aaron Brown (1987–2006),  fatally shot by police officer, Alexandria, VA